Tetratricopeptide repeat domain 3 pseudogene 1 is a protein that in humans is encoded by the TTC3P1 gene.

Aliases for TTC3P1 Gene 
GeneCards Symbol: TTC3P1 2

Tetratricopeptide Repeat Domain 3 Pseudogene 1 2 3 5

RNF105L 2 3 5

TTC3L 3 5

Tetratricopeptide Repeat Domain 3-Like 2

External Ids for TTC3P1 Gene

HGNC: 23318 NCBI Entrez Gene: 286495 Ensembl: ENSG00000215105

Previous HGNC Symbols for TTC3P1 Gene

TTC3L

Previous GeneCards Identifiers for TTC3P1 Gene

GC0XM074961

Summaries for TTC3P1 Gene 
GeneCards Summary for TTC3P1 Gene

TTC3P1 (Tetratricopeptide Repeat Domain 3 Pseudogene 1) is a Pseudogene.

Additional gene information for TTC3P1 Gene

HGNC (23318) NCBI Entrez Gene (286495) Ensembl (ENSG00000215105)

Alliance of Genome Resources

Search for TTC3P1 at DataMed

Search for TTC3P1 at HumanCyc

References 

Pseudogenes